The American School Foundation, A.C, (in Spanish known as "Colegio Americano") is an independentinternational school in the American tradition based in Mexico City. It offers coeducational college-preparatory school for international students aged 3 to 18. Founded in 1888, it is the oldest operating accredited American School outside the United States, and is widely considered to be amongst the first international schools in the World.  

As of 2022, over 2,500 students from more than 40 countries attend the school. English is the language of instruction with the exception of a bilingual program in the lower school and courses in Spanish at the secondary level. The school has about 280 teaching staff.

The campus facilities include a 17-acre campus with four libraries, science labs in each school, and 600 computers in classrooms, three indoor gymnasiums, an indoor heated pool, a football stadium, lighted tennis courts, track, and various athletic fields.

The school grants three diplomas for students graduating from its Upper School: the Mexican diploma of the Secretaría de Educación Pública (SEP), the American diploma, and the International Baccalaureate (IB).

History
The American School Foundation, A.C. was founded on August 6, 1888, with a starting class of nine boys and girls attending kindergarten in the private home of oilman John Davis on Iturbide Street, near what is now Bucareli and Reforma. The lessons were taught in English by Mr. Davis’ mother-in-law, Bessie Files. In 1894, With a growing student body the school became the “Mexico Grammar School,” and moved to a rented building on Calle Colón. In 1902, H.H. Cronyn and Charles E. Cummings, a key figure in the consolidation of The American School, are the superintendent and board president, respectively, by this time, and are credited with helping the school move forward after its wartime troubles. Charles E. Cummings was board president for most of the first 16 years of the 20th century. Then, housed in a larger building on Industria Street in Colonia San Rafael, the school added a high school and accordingly changed its name to the Mexico City Grammar and High School. Enrollment was 455 about that time.

Between 1905 and 1908, The American School Association was formed by a number of Mexico City businessmen, with Paul Hudson as the first president and Schuyler Herron as the superintendent until 1908. The breakout of the Mexican Revolution in 1910 curtailed foreign investment and decreasing school enrollment. The school remained open throughout most of the conflict, although it did briefly close its doors during the events of  the Decena Trágica, ten days of violence in Mexico City following the assassination of President Francisco I. Madero and Vice-president José María Pino Suárez, a rare occurrence school history. In 1914, Walter Thurston, later to become the U.S. Ambassador to Mexico, graduated from The American School.

In 1914, after the United States occupation of Veracruz,  so few Americans were left in Mexico City that the high school was closed after the 1915 class graduated, restarting with a freshman class in 1917. One of the six graduates of the 1915 class was Kingsley J. Niven, a school clerk as well as a student who took over as de facto school administrator and ended up signing his own diploma.

In 1921, The American School Association was dissolved and replaced by a non-profit educational institution. It is at this time that the School got its current name "The American School Foundation" with its duration defined as "in perpetuity." Its purpose was to establish a teaching institution that utilized the most modern and effective teaching methods used in the United States. Founding members include S. Bolling Wright, Lewis Lamm, Edward Orring, Harry Wright and Charles Cummings.

In 1946, the school acquired the 17-acre (69,000 m2) Bondojito campus, across the street from ABC Hospital, where it remains to this day. Over the years, the campus has grown to include four libraries, science labs in each school, and over 600 computers in classrooms, three indoor gymnasiums, an indoor heated pool, a football stadium, lighted tennis courts, track, and various athletic fields.

During 1979, a group of American School students form part of the welcoming committee for the February visit to Mexico City of U.S. President Jimmy Carter. Again in 2013, ASF students were invited to hear President Obama’s Speech to Mexican Students at the Anthropology Museum in Mexico City.

Today

The American School Foundation, A.C., located in Mexico City, serves students from Kindergarten through 12th grade in four schools: the Early Childhood Center (ages 3–7), the Lower School (grades 1–5), the Middle School (grades 6–8), and the Upper School (grades 9–12). The American School Foundation has two primary languages of instruction, English and Spanish.

By nationalities, the student body of 2,500 is approximately 58% Mexican, 21% from the United States with Mexican connections, and 21% from different nationalities. Its  campus and facilities, as well as its academic and extracurricular programs, are comparable to independent schools in the United States.

Sports offered include track & field, swimming, soccer to American football.

Academics

The American School Foundation, A.C. is accredited by the Southern Association of Schools and Colleges. Studies are recognized by the Mexican Secretary of Public Education and high school level studies can be validated by UNAM, useful for students who wish to study in Mexico or another Spanish-speaking country. The American School Foundation, A.C. is an International Baccalaureate World School offering the Primary Years (PYP), Middle Years (MYP) and Diploma Programs. ASF also offers Advanced Placement courses.

Most students graduate proficient in at least two languages, English and Spanish. Nearly 99% of Upper School graduates attend college.

See also
 American immigration to Mexico

References

External links
Official site
Association of American Schools in Mexico

American international schools in Mexico City
High schools in Mexico City
International Baccalaureate schools in Mexico
Álvaro Obregón, Mexico City
Private schools in Mexico
Educational institutions established in 1888
1888 establishments in Mexico